Streblote panda is a moth of the family Lasiocampidae.

References

Moths described in 1820